Existential psychotherapy is a form of psychotherapy based on the model of human nature and experience developed by the existential tradition of European philosophy. It focuses on concepts that are universally applicable to human existence including death, freedom, responsibility, and the meaning of life. Instead of regarding human experiences such as anxiety, alienation, and depression as implying the presence of mental illness, existential psychotherapy sees these experiences as natural stages in a normal process of human development and maturation. In facilitating this process of development and maturation, existential psychotherapy involves a philosophical exploration of an individual's experiences stressing the individual's freedom and responsibility to facilitate a higher degree of meaning and well-being in their life.

Background
The philosophers who are especially pertinent to the development of existential psychotherapy are those whose works were directly aimed at making sense of human existence. For example, the fields of phenomenology and existential philosophy are especially and directly responsible for the generation of existential therapy.

The starting point of existential philosophy (see Warnock 1970; Macquarrie 1972; Mace 1999; Van Deurzen and Kenward 2005) can be traced back to the nineteenth century and the works of Søren Kierkegaard and Friedrich Nietzsche. Their works conflicted with the predominant ideologies of their time and committed to the exploration of reality as it can be experienced in a passionate and personal manner.

Søren Kierkegaard (1813–1855)
Soren Kierkegaard (1813–1855) protested vehemently against popular misunderstanding and abuse of Christian dogma and the so-called 'objectivity' of science (Kierkegaard, 1841, 1844). He thought that both were ways of avoiding the anxiety inherent in human existence. He had great contempt for the way life was lived by those around him and believed truth could only be discovered subjectively by the individual in action. He felt people lacked the courage to take a leap of faith and live with passion and commitment from the inward depth of existence. This involved a constant struggle between the finite and infinite aspects of our nature as part of the difficult task of creating a self and finding meaning.

Friedrich Nietzsche (1844–1900)
Friedrich Nietzsche (1844–1900) took this philosophy of life a step further. His starting point was the notion that God is dead, that is, the idea of God was outmoded and limiting (Nietzsche, 1861, 1874, 1886). Furthermore, the Enlightenment—with the newfound faith in reason and rationality—had killed or replaced God with a new Truth that was perhaps more pernicious than the one it replaced.  Science and rationality were the new "God," but instead took the form of a deity that was colder and less comforting than before.  Nietzsche exerted a significant impact on the development of psychology in general, but he specifically influenced an approach that emphasized an understanding of life from a personal perspective. In exploring the various needs of the individual about the ontological conditions of being, Nietzsche asserted that all things are in a state of "ontological privation," in which they long to become more than they are. This state of deprivation has major implications for the physiological and psychological needs of the individual.

Edmund Husserl (1859–1938)
While Kierkegaard and Nietzsche drew attention to the human issues that needed to be addressed, Edmund Husserl's phenomenology (Husserl, 1960, 1962; Moran, 2000) provided the method to address them rigorously. He contended that natural sciences assume the separateness of subject and object and that this kind of dualism can only lead to error. He proposed a whole new mode of investigation and understanding of the world and our experience of it. He said that prejudice has to be put aside or 'bracketed,' for us to meet the world afresh and discover what is absolutely fundamental, and only directly available to us through intuition. If people want to grasp the essence of things, instead of explaining and analyzing them, they have to learn to describe and understand them.

Max Scheler (1874–1928)
Max Scheler (1874–1928) developed philosophical anthropology from a material ethic of values ("Materielle Wertethik") that opposed Immanuel Kant's ethics of duty ("Pflichtethik"). He described a hierarchical system of values that further developed phenomenological philosophy. Scheler described the human psyche as being composed of four layers analogous to the layers of organic nature. However, in his description, the human psyche is opposed by the principle of the human spirit. Scheler's philosophy forms the basis of Viktor Frankl's logotherapy and existential analysis.

Martin Heidegger (1889–1976)
Martin Heidegger (1889–1976) applied the phenomenological method to understanding the meaning of being (Heidegger, 1962, 1968). He argued that poetry and deep philosophical thinking could bring greater insight into what it means to be in the world than what can be achieved through scientific knowledge. He explored human beings in the world in a manner that revolutionized classical ideas about the self and psychology. He recognized the importance of time, space, death, and human relatedness. He also favored hermeneutics, an old philosophical method of investigation, which is the art of interpretation.

Unlike interpretation as practiced in psychoanalysis (which consists of referring a person's experience to a pre-established theoretical framework), this kind of interpretation seeks to understand how the person himself/herself subjectively experiences something.

Jean-Paul Sartre (1905–1980)
Jean-Paul Sartre (1905–1980) contributed many other strands of existential exploration, particularly regarding emotions, imagination, and the person's insertion into a social and political world.

The philosophy of existence, on the contrary, is carried by a wide-ranging literature, which includes many authors, such as Karl Jaspers (1951, 1963), Paul Tillich, Martin Buber, and Hans-Georg Gadamer within the Germanic tradition and Albert Camus, Gabriel Marcel, Paul Ricoeur, Maurice Merleau-Ponty, Simone de Beauvoir and Emmanuel Lévinas within the French tradition (see for instance Spiegelberg, 1972, Kearney, 1986 or van Deurzen-Smith, 1997).

Others
From the start of the 20th century, some psychotherapists were, however, inspired by phenomenology and its possibilities for working with people.
 Otto Rank (1884–1939), an Austrian psychoanalyst who broke with Freud in the mid-1920s, was the first existential therapist.
 Ludwig Binswanger, in Switzerland, also attempted to bring existential insights to his work with patients, in the Kreuzlingen sanatorium where he was a psychiatrist.
Much of his work was translated into English during the 1940s and 1950s and, together with the immigration to the USA of Paul Tillich (1886–1965) (Tillich, 1952) and others, this had a considerable effect on the popularization of existential ideas as a basis for therapy (Valle and King, 1978; Cooper, 2003).
 Rollo May (1909–1994) played an important role in this, and his writing (1969, 1983; May et al., 1958) kept the existential influence alive in America, leading eventually to a specific formulation of therapy (Bugental, 1981; May and Yalom, 1985; Yalom, 1980).
Humanistic psychology was directly influenced by these ideas.
 Irvin Yalom (1931-) continued, revitalized and augmented the  existential phylosophical tradition in psychotherapy. His book "Existential Psychotheraphy" became a classical work in the field. He organized and described in depth the "four givens" (Yalom, 1980). He also wrote several teaching novels (e.g. "When Nietzsche wept") which were based on existential issues.
 Viktor Frankl (1905–1997) was possibly the individual most responsible for spreading existential psychology throughout the world. He was invited by over 200 universities worldwide and accomplished over 80 journeys to North America alone, first invited by Gordon Allport at Harvard University.
 In Europe, after Otto Rank, existential ideas were combined with some psychoanalytic principles and a method of existential analysis was developed by Medard Boss (1903–1990) (1957a, 1957b, 1979) in close co-operation with Heidegger.
 In France, the ideas of Sartre (1956, 1962) and Merleau-Ponty (1962) and of some practitioners (Minkowski, 1970) were important and influential, but no specific therapeutic method was developed from them.

Development

Development in Europe 
The European School of existential therapy is dominated by three forms of therapy: Logotherapy, Daseinsanalysis and Existential Phenomenological Therapy. Logotherapy was developed by psychiatrist Viktor E. Frankl. Frankl was heavily influenced by existential philosophy, as well as his own experience in the Nazi concentration camps of World War II. The three main components to Logotherapy are Freedom of Will, which is the ability to change one's life to the degree that such change is possible, Will to Meaning, which places meaning at the center of well-being, and Meaning in Life, which asserts the objectivity of meaning. The primary techniques of Logotherapy involve helping the clients to identify and remove any barriers to the pursuit of meaning in their own lives, to determine what is personally meaningful, and to then help patients effectively pursue related goals.

Daseinsanalysis is a psychotherapeutic system developed upon the ideas of Martin Heidegger, as well as the psychoanalytic theories of Sigmund Freud, that seeks to help the individual find autonomy and meaning in their "being in the world" (a rough translation of "Dasein").

Existential Phenomenological Therapy was inspired by the work of R.D. Laing and significantly developed by Emmy van Deurzen, whose work as a philosopher inspired her work as a psychotherapist. All three strands of existential therapy are documented in the recent Wiley World Handbook of Existential Therapy, together with the North and South American, Australian and other developments.

Development in Britain
Britain became a fertile ground for further development of the existential approach when R. D. Laing and David Cooper, often associated with the anti-psychiatry movement, took Sartre's existential ideas as the basis for their work (Laing, 1960, 1961; Cooper, 1967; Laing and Cooper, 1964). Without developing a concrete method of therapy, they critically reconsidered the notion of mental illness and its treatment. In the late 1960s, they established an experimental therapeutic community at Kingsley Hall in the East End of London, where people could come to live through their 'madness' without the usual medical treatment. They also founded the Philadelphia Association, an organization providing an alternative living, therapy, and therapeutic training from this perspective. The Philadelphia Association is still in existence today and is now committed to the exploration of the works of philosophers such as Ludwig Wittgenstein, Jacques Derrida, Levinas, and Michel Foucault as well as the work of the French psychoanalyst Jacques Lacan. It also runs some small therapeutic households along these lines. The Arbours Association is another group that grew out of the Kingsley Hall experiment. Founded by Joseph Berke and Schatzman in the 1970s, it now runs a training program in psychotherapy, a crisis center, and several therapeutic communities. The existential input in the Arbours has gradually been replaced with a more neo-Kleinian emphasis.

The impetus for further development of the existential approach in Britain has primarily come from the development of some existentially based courses in academic institutions. This started with the programs created by Emmy van Deurzen, initially at Antioch University in London and subsequently at Regent's College, London , and since then at the New School of Psychotherapy and Counseling, also located in London. The latter is a purely existentially based training institute, which offers postgraduate degrees validated by the University of Sheffield and Middlesex University. In the past few decades, the existential approach has spread rapidly and has become a welcome alternative to established methods. There are now many other, mostly academic, centers in Britain that provide training in existential counseling and psychotherapy and a rapidly growing interest in the approach in the voluntary sector and the National Health Service.

British publications dealing with existential therapy include contributions by these authors: Jenner (de Koning and Jenner, 1982), Heaton (1988, 1994), Cohn (1994, 1997), Spinelli (1997), Cooper (1989, 2002), Eleftheriadou (1994), Lemma-Wright (1994), Du Plock (1997), Strasser and Strasser (1997), van Deurzen (1997, 1998, 2002), van Deurzen and Arnold-Baker (2005), and van Deurzen and Kenward (2005). Other writers such as Lomas (1981) and Smail (1978, 1987, 1993) have published work relevant to the approach, although not explicitly 'existential' in orientation. The journal of the British Society for Phenomenology regularly publishes work on existential and phenomenological psychotherapy. The Society for Existential Analysis was founded in 1988, initiated by van Deurzen. This society brings together psychotherapists, psychologists, psychiatrists, counselors, and philosophers working from an existential perspective. It offers regular fora for discussion and debate as well as significant annual conferences. It publishes the Journal of the Society for Existential Analysis twice a year. It is also a member of the International Federation of Daseinsanalysis, which stimulates international exchange between representatives of the approach from around the world. An International Society for Existential Therapists also exists. It was founded in 2006 by Emmy van Deurzen and Digby Tantam and is called the International Community of Existential Counsellors and Therapists (ICECAP).

Development in Canada 
New developments in existential therapy in the last 20 years include existential positive psychology (EPP) and meaning therapy (MT). Different from the traditional approach to existential therapy, these new developments incorporate research findings from contemporary positive psychology.

EPP can reframe the traditional issues of existential concerns into positive psychology questions that can be subjected to empirical research. It also focuses on personal growth and transformation as much as on existential anxiety. Later, EPP was incorporated into the second wave of positive psychology (PP 2.0).

Meaning Therapy (MT) is an extension of Frankl's logotherapy and America's humanistic-existential tradition; it is also pluralistic because it incorporates elements of cognitive-behavioral therapy, narrative therapy, and positive psychotherapy, with meaning as its central organizing construct. MT not only appeals to people's natural desires for happiness and significance but also makes skillful use of their innate capacity for meaning-seeking and meaning-making. MT strikes a balance between a person-centered approach and a psycho-educational approach. At the outset of therapy, clients are informed of the use of meaning-centered interventions appropriate for their predicaments because of the empirical evidence for the vital role of meaning in healing and thriving. MT is a comprehensive and pluralistic way to address all aspects of clients' existential concerns. Clients can benefit from MT in two ways: (1) a custom-tailored treatment to solve their presenting problems, and (2) a collaborative journey to create a preferred better future.

View of the human mind 
Existential therapy (of the American, existential-humanistic tradition) starts with the belief that although humans are essentially alone in the world, they long to be connected to others. People want to have meaning in one another's lives, but ultimately they must come to realize that they cannot depend on others for validation, and with that realization, they finally acknowledge and understand that they are fundamentally alone. The result of this revelation is anxiety in the knowledge that our validation must come from within and not from others.

Existential therapy is based on a theory of mind, and of psychology.  In existentialism, personality is based on choosing to be, authentically, the real you, given an understanding based on a philosophical idea of what a person is.  Therefore, practical therapeutic applications can be derived given a theory of personality, emotion, and “the good life.”

This leads to practical therapeutic applications like dealing with personal choices in life that lead to personal happiness.  Personal happiness based on a concept of yourself as having the freedom of directing your life and making necessary changes (so to speak, a radical freedom).  So, a full philosophical understanding of existentialism is basic to methods implemented for emotional and life changes.  That is, a background in philosophy is basic to existential therapy.

Philosophical issues of the self, personality, philosophy of mind, meaning of life, personal development are all fundamentally relevant to any practical therapeutic expectations. Existentialism

Psychological dysfunction 
Because there is no single existential view, opinions about psychological dysfunction vary.

For theorists aligned with Yalom, psychological dysfunction results from the individual's refusal or inability to deal with the normal existential anxiety that comes from confronting life's "givens": mortality, isolation, meaninglessness, and freedom.

For other theorists since the work of Thomas Szasz in the 1960s, there is no such thing as psychological dysfunction or mental illness. Every way of being is merely an expression of how one chooses to live one's life. However, one may feel unable to come to terms with the anxiety of being alone in the world. If so, an existential psychotherapist can assist one in accepting these feelings rather than trying to change them as if there is something wrong. Everyone has the freedom to choose how they are going to exist in life; however, this freedom may go unpracticed. It may appear easier and safer not to make decisions that one will be responsible for. Many people will remain unaware of alternative choices in life for various societal reasons.

The good life 
Existentialism suggests that it is possible for individuals to face the anxieties of life head on, embrace the human condition of aloneness and to revel in the freedom to choose and take full responsibility for their choices. They can aim to take control of their lives and steer themselves in any direction they choose. There is no need to halt feelings of meaninglessness but instead to choose and focus on new meanings for the living. By building, loving and creating, life can be lived as one's own adventure. One can accept one's own mortality and overcome the fear of death. Although the French author Albert Camus denied the specific label of existentialist in his novel, L'Étranger, the novel's main character, Meursault, ends the novel by doing just this. He accepts his mortality and rejects the constrictions of society he previously placed on himself, leaving him unencumbered and free to live his life with an unclouded mind. Also, Gerd B. Achenbach has refreshed the Socratic tradition with his own blend of philosophical counseling, as has Michel Weber with his Chromatiques Center in Belgium.

The strictly Sartrean perspective of existential psychotherapy is generally unconcerned with the client's past, but instead, the emphasis is on the choices to be made in the present and future. The counselor and the client may reflect upon how the client has answered life's questions in the past, but attention ultimately shifts to searching for a new and increased awareness in the present and enabling a new freedom and responsibility to act. The patient can then accept that they are not special and that their existence is simply coincidental, or without destiny or fate. By accepting this, they can overcome their anxieties and instead view life as moments in which they are fundamentally free.

Four worlds
Existential thinkers seek to avoid restrictive models that categorize or label people. Instead, they look for the universals that can be observed cross-culturally. There is no existential personality theory which divides humanity into types or reduces people to part components. Instead, there is a description of the different levels of experience and existence with which people are inevitably confronted. The way in which a person is in the world at a particular stage can be charted on this general map of human existence (Binswanger, 1963; Yalom, 1980; van Deurzen, 1984).

In line with the view taken by van Deurzen, one can distinguish four basic dimensions of human existence: the physical, the social, the psychological, and the spiritual.

On each of these dimensions, people encounter the world and shape their attitude out of their particular take on their experience. Their orientation towards the world defines their reality. The four dimensions are interwoven and provide a complex four-dimensional force field for their existence. Individuals are stretched between a positive pole of what they aspire to on each dimension and a negative pole of what they fear. Binswanger proposed the first three of these dimensions from Heidegger's description of Umwelt and Mitwelt and his further notion of Eigenwelt. The fourth dimension was added by van Deurzen from Heidegger's description of a spiritual world (Überwelt) in Heidegger's later work.

Physical dimension
On the physical dimension (Umwelt), individuals relate to their environment and the givens of the natural world around them. This includes their attitude to the body they have, to the concrete surroundings they find themselves in, to the climate and the weather, to objects and material possessions, to the bodies of other people, their own bodily needs, to health and illness and their mortality. The struggle on this dimension is, in general terms, between the search for domination over the elements and natural law (as in technology, or in sports) and the need to accept the limitations of natural boundaries (as in ecology or old age). While people generally aim for security on this dimension (through health and wealth), much of life brings a gradual disillusionment and realization that such security can only be temporary. Recognizing limitations can deliver a significant release of tension.

Social dimension
On the social dimension (Mitwelt), individuals relate to others as they interact with the public world around them. This dimension includes their response to the culture they live in, as well as to the class and race they belong to (and also those they do not belong to). Attitudes here range from love to hate and from cooperation to competition. The dynamic contradictions can be understood concerning acceptance versus rejection or belonging versus isolation. Some people prefer to withdraw from the world of others as much as possible. Others blindly chase public acceptance by going along with the rules and fashions of the moment. Otherwise, they try to rise above these by becoming trendsetters themselves. By acquiring fame or other forms of power, individuals can attain dominance over others temporarily. Sooner or later, however, everyone is confronted with both failure and aloneness.

Psychological dimension
On the psychological dimension (Eigenwelt), individuals relate to themselves and in this way create a personal world. This dimension includes views about their character, their past experience and their future possibilities. Contradictions here are often experienced regarding personal strengths and weaknesses. People search for a sense of identity, a feeling of being substantial and having a self.

But inevitably many events will confront them with evidence to the contrary and plunge them into a state of confusion or disintegration. Activity and passivity are an important polarity here. Self-affirmation and resolution go with the former and surrender and yielding with the latter. Facing the final dissolution of self that comes with personal loss and the facing of death might bring anxiety and confusion to many who have not yet given up their sense of self-importance.

Spiritual dimension
On the spiritual dimension (Überwelt) (van Deurzen, 1984), individuals relate to the unknown and thus create a sense of an ideal world, an ideology, and a philosophical outlook. It is there that they find meaning by putting all the pieces of the puzzle together for themselves. For some people, this is done by adhering to a religion or other prescriptive worldview; for others, it is about discovering or attributing meaning in a more secular or personal way. The contradictions that must be faced on this dimension are often related to the tension between purpose and absurdity, hope and despair. People create their values in search of something that matters enough to live or die for, something that may even have ultimate and universal validity. Usually, the aim is the conquest of a soul or something that will substantially surpass mortality (as in having contributed something valuable to humankind). Facing the void and the possibility of nothingness are the indispensable counterparts of this quest for the eternal.

Research support 
There has not been a tremendous amount of research on existential therapy. Much of the research focuses on people receiving therapy who also have medical concerns such as cancer. Despite this, some studies have indicated positive efficacy for existential therapies with certain populations. Qualitative research has shown there is a positive learning outcome of Existential Therapy. Overall, however, more research is needed before definitive scientific claims can be made.

An overview of research in Existential and Phenomenological Therapy was provided in the magnum opus on the approach, The Wiley World Handbook of Existential Therapy, edited by Emmy van Deurzen with Erik Craig, Alfried Laengle, Kirk Schneider, Digby Tantam and Simon du Plock. Joel Vos wrote this chapter in which he remarked that Dilthey, and many other phenomenological philosophers and therapists, have tried to turn the scientific paradigm more towards an inside understanding the subjectively lived experiences from clients, therapists and what happens in their relationship and in the therapeutic processes. Phenomenological research is now standard in most doctoral trainings in counselling psychology, providing a rich array of existential findings and demonstrating the importance of qualitative understanding alongside quantitative understanding of human existence. Clinical trials on meaning based therapies have shown them to be helpful in enabling clients to live meaningful lives despite their setbacks, limitations and difficulties.

See also

 Carl R. Rogers
 Ludwig Binswanger
 Medard Boss
 Gestalt therapy
 Existential crisis
 Existentialism
 Viktor Frankl
 Paul T. P. Wong
 Martin Heidegger
 Thomas Hora
 Søren Kierkegaard
 R. D. Laing
 Rollo May
 Clark Moustakas
 Karlfried Graf Dürckheim
 Friedrich Nietzsche
 Otto Rank
 Jean-Paul Sartre
 Irvin D. Yalom
 Karl Jaspers
 Martin Buber
 Contextual therapy
 Emmy van Deurzen
 William Glasser
 Metapsychiatry
 Philosophical consultancy
 Jan Hendrik van den Berg
 Martti Olavi Siirala
 Kirk J. Schneider
 Elvin Semrad

References

Further reading

Kierkegaard, Søren; The Concept of Dread and The Sickness Unto Death, Princeton University Press
Längle, Alfried (1990); Existential Analysis Psychotherapy, The Internat. Forum Logotherapy, Berkeley, 13, 1, 17–19.
Längle, Alfried (2003a); Special edition on Existential Analysis, European Psychotherapy 4, 1
Längle, Alfried (2003b); The Search for Meaning in Life and the Fundamental Existential Motivations, Psychotherapy in Australia, 10, 1, 22-27
Längle Silvia, Wurm CSE (2015); Living Your Own Life: Existential Analysis in Action, London: Karnac

ibid (1997) Everyday Mysteries: Existential Dimensions of Psychotherapy, London: Routledge. (2nd edition 2006)

Deurzen, E. van and Arnold-Baker, C., eds. (2005) Existential Perspectives on Human Issues:  a Handbook for Practice, London: Palgrave, Macmillan.
 Deurzen, E. van & M. Adams (2016). Skills in Existential Counselling and Psychotherapy, 2nd Edition (2016). London: Sage.
 Deurzen, E. van & Craig, E. & Längle A. & Schneider, K.J. & Tantam, D. & du Plock, S. eds. (2019) The Wiley World Handbook of Existential Therapy, Chichester: Wiley Blackwell. 

 Willburg, Peter, "The Therapist as Listener: Martin Heidegger and the Missing Dimension of Counseling and Psychotherapy Training"
Wilkes, R and Milton, M, (2006) Being an Existential Therapist: An IPA study of existential therapists' experiences, Existential Analysis. Jan 2006

Milton, M., Charles, L., Judd, D., O'Brien, Tipney, A. and Turner, A . (2003) The Existential-Phenomenological Paradigm: The Importance for Integration, Existential Analysis
Judd, D. and Milton, M. (2001) Psychotherapy with Lesbian and Gay Clients: Existential-Phenomenological Contributions to Training, Lesbian and Gay Psychology Review, 2(1): 16-23
Corrie, S. and Milton, M . (2000) "The Relationship Between Existential-Phenomenological and Cognitive-Behavioural Therapies", European Journal of Psychotherapy, Counseling and Health.

Milton, M (2000) "Is Existential Psychotherapy A Lesbian and Gay Affirmative Psychotherapy?" Journal of the Society for Existential Analysis,
Milton, M. and Judd, D. (1999) "The Dilemma that is Assessment", Journal of the Society for Existential Analysis, 102–114.
Milton, M. (1999) "Depression and the Uncertainty of Identity: An existential-phenomenological exploration in just twelve sessions", Changes: An International Journal of Psychology and Psychotherapy,
Milton, M (1997) "An Existential Approach to HIV Related Psychotherapy", Journal of the Society for Existential Analysis, V8.1, 115-129
Milton, M (1994). "The Case for Existential Therapy in HIV Related Psychotherapy", Counselling Psychology Quarterly, V7 (4). 367-374
Milton, M. (1994). "HIV Related Psychotherapy and Its Existential Concerns", Counselling Psychology Review, V9 (4). 13-24
Milton, M (1993) "Existential Thought and Client Centred Therapy", Counselling Psychology Quarterly, V6 (3). 239-248
 Sanders, Marc, Existential Depression. How to recognize and cure life-related sadness in gifted people, Self-Help Manual, 2013.

Schneider, K.J. (2009). "Awakening to Awe: Personal Stories of Profound Transformation." Lanham, MD: Jason Aronson.
Schneider, K.J.,& Krug, O.T. (2010). "Existential-Humanistic Therapy." Washington, DC: American Psychological Association Press.
Schneider, K.J. (2011).  "Existential-Humanistic Therapies". In S.B. Messer & Alan Gurman (Eds.), Essential Psychotherapies. (Third ed.).  New York: Guilford.
Seidner, Stanley S. (June 10, 2009) "A Trojan Horse: Logotherapeutic Transcendence and its Secular Implications for Theology" . Mater Dei Institute. pp 10–12.
 Sørensen, A. D. & K. D. Keller (eds.) (2015): Psykoterapi og eksistentiel fænomenologi." Aalborg: Aalborg Universitetsforlag
Tillich, Paul (1952). The Courage to Be. Yale University Press.
Wilberg, P. (2004) The Therapist as Listener - Martin Heidegger and the Missing Dimension of Counselling and Psychotherapy Training

External links

 Existential positive psychology
 Searching for meaning

Existentialist concepts
 
Psychotherapies